Graphocentrism or scriptism is a typically unconscious interpretative bias in which writing is privileged over speech.

Biases in favor of the written or printed word are closely associated with the ranking of sight above sound, the eye above the ear, which has been called 'ocularcentrism'. It opposes phonocentrism, which is the bias in favor of speech.

See also 
 Harold A. Innis, Empire and Communications

References

Further reading 
 
 

Philosophy of language
Writing
Sociolinguistics